Munshi Siddique Ahmad (– 19 October 2011) was a Bangladeshi rice scientist. He served as the associate director of the Bangladesh Rice Research Institute (BRRI). He developed BRRI Shail (BR4), which was responsible for increasing rice production – from 8 million tons in 1965 to 20 million tons in 1975. In 1997, he earned Independence Day Award in the science and technology category from the Government of Bangladesh.

Education
Ahmad passed ISc from Government Rajendra College, Faridpur, in 1946. He then moved to Dhaka and got admitted into The Bengal Agricultural Institute (Present Sher-e-Bangla Agricultural University)   under the University of Dhaka. He graduated from the college in 1949, and completed his master's degree in Agriculture from the University of Dhaka in crop botany in 1956. In 1968, he earned his Ph.D. degree in plant genetics from Texas A&M University.

Career
Ahmad served as the head of the breeding division at BRRI. He developed more than 30 new varieties of HYV (high-yielding varieties) rice, e.g. BR3, BR4, BR10, and BR11.

Awards
 Kazi Mahbubullah Trust Gold Medal
 Independence Day Award (1997)
 Begum Jebunsessa and Kazi Mahbubullah Trust Award (1986)
 Bangabandhu Award (1974)

In 1969, Siddique Ahmad was awarded the Tamgha-e-Pakistan, but he renounced it in March 1971, during the non-cooperation movement against the-then Government of Pakistan. Besides, under his leadership, the breeding division of BRRI received the President's Award in 1977 and the FAO Bronze Plaque in 1980.

References

Bangladeshi scientists
University of Dhaka alumni
Texas A&M University alumni
Recipients of the Independence Day Award
1920s births
2011 deaths
Place of birth missing
Date of birth missing
Place of death missing
Sher-e-Bangla Agricultural University alumni